Rzuchów  is a village in the administrative district of Gmina Dąbie, within Koło County, Greater Poland Voivodeship, in central Poland.

During the German occupation of Poland (World War II), the forest of Rzuchów was the site of German massacres of Poles, who were previously imprisoned in the nearby town of Koło (see Nazi crimes against the Polish nation). On 11 November 1939 the German police murdered 80 people there.

Transport
The Polish A2 motorway runs near Rzuchów, south of the village.

References

Villages in Koło County
Nazi war crimes in Poland